This is a navigation article to all list articles detailing statutory instruments in the United Kingdom by year published.

Prior to 1949
1947 List of Statutory Instruments of the United Kingdom, 1947
1948 List of Statutory Instruments of the United Kingdom, 1948
1949 List of Statutory Instruments of the United Kingdom, 1949

1950-1959
1950 List of Statutory Instruments of the United Kingdom, 1950
1951 List of Statutory Instruments of the United Kingdom, 1951
1952 List of Statutory Instruments of the United Kingdom, 1952
1953 List of Statutory Instruments of the United Kingdom, 1953
1954 List of Statutory Instruments of the United Kingdom, 1954
1955 List of Statutory Instruments of the United Kingdom, 1955
1956 List of Statutory Instruments of the United Kingdom, 1956
1957 List of Statutory Instruments of the United Kingdom, 1957
1958 List of Statutory Instruments of the United Kingdom, 1958
1959 List of Statutory Instruments of the United Kingdom, 1959

1960-1969
1960 List of Statutory Instruments of the United Kingdom, 1960
1961 List of Statutory Instruments of the United Kingdom, 1961
1962 List of Statutory Instruments of the United Kingdom, 1962
1963 List of Statutory Instruments of the United Kingdom, 1963
1964 List of Statutory Instruments of the United Kingdom, 1964
1965 List of Statutory Instruments of the United Kingdom, 1965
1966 List of Statutory Instruments of the United Kingdom, 1966
1967 List of Statutory Instruments of the United Kingdom, 1967
1968 List of Statutory Instruments of the United Kingdom, 1968
1969 List of Statutory Instruments of the United Kingdom, 1969

1970–1979
1970 List of Statutory Instruments of the United Kingdom, 1970
1971 List of Statutory Instruments of the United Kingdom, 1971
1972 List of Statutory Instruments of the United Kingdom, 1972
1973 List of Statutory Instruments of the United Kingdom, 1973
1974 List of Statutory Instruments of the United Kingdom, 1974
1975 List of Statutory Instruments of the United Kingdom, 1975
1976 List of Statutory Instruments of the United Kingdom, 1976
1977 List of Statutory Instruments of the United Kingdom, 1977
1978 List of Statutory Instruments of the United Kingdom, 1978
1979 List of Statutory Instruments of the United Kingdom, 1979

1980–1989
1980 List of Statutory Instruments of the United Kingdom, 1980
1981 List of Statutory Instruments of the United Kingdom, 1981
1982 List of Statutory Instruments of the United Kingdom, 1982
1983 List of Statutory Instruments of the United Kingdom, 1983
1984 List of Statutory Instruments of the United Kingdom, 1984
1985 List of Statutory Instruments of the United Kingdom, 1985
1986 List of Statutory Instruments of the United Kingdom, 1986
1987 List of Statutory Instruments of the United Kingdom, 1987
1988 List of Statutory Instruments of the United Kingdom, 1988
1989 List of Statutory Instruments of the United Kingdom, 1989

1990–1999
1990 List of Statutory Instruments of the United Kingdom, 1990
1991 List of Statutory Instruments of the United Kingdom, 1991
1992 List of Statutory Instruments of the United Kingdom, 1992
1993 List of Statutory Instruments of the United Kingdom, 1993
1994 List of Statutory Instruments of the United Kingdom, 1994
1995 List of Statutory Instruments of the United Kingdom, 1995
1996 List of Statutory Instruments of the United Kingdom, 1996
1997 List of Statutory Instruments of the United Kingdom, 1997
1998 List of Statutory Instruments of the United Kingdom, 1998
1999 List of Statutory Instruments of the United Kingdom, 1999

2000–2009
2000 List of Statutory Instruments of the United Kingdom, 2000
2001 List of Statutory Instruments of the United Kingdom, 2001
2002 List of Statutory Instruments of the United Kingdom, 2002
2003 List of Statutory Instruments of the United Kingdom, 2003
2004 List of Statutory Instruments of the United Kingdom, 2004
2005 List of Statutory Instruments of the United Kingdom, 2005
2006 List of Statutory Instruments of the United Kingdom, 2006
2007 List of Statutory Instruments of the United Kingdom, 2007
2008 List of Statutory Instruments of the United Kingdom, 2008
2009 List of Statutory Instruments of the United Kingdom, 2009

2010-present
2010 List of Statutory Instruments of the United Kingdom, 2010
2011 List of Statutory Instruments of the United Kingdom, 2011
2012 List of Statutory Instruments of the United Kingdom, 2012
2013 List of Statutory Instruments of the United Kingdom, 2013
2014 List of Statutory Instruments of the United Kingdom, 2014
2015 List of Statutory Instruments of the United Kingdom, 2015
2016 List of Statutory Instruments of the United Kingdom, 2016
2017 List of Statutory Instruments of the United Kingdom, 2017
2018 List of Statutory Instruments of the United Kingdom, 2018
2019 List of Statutory Instruments of the United Kingdom, 2019
2020 List of Statutory Instruments of the United Kingdom, 2020
2021 List of Statutory Instruments of the United Kingdom, 2021
 2022 List of Statutory Instruments of the United Kingdom, 2022
 2023 List of Statutory Instruments of the United Kingdom, 2023

See also
 List of Statutory Rules and Orders of the United Kingdom

 
stat